Benton Public Library serves the town of Benton, Illinois, and the residents of the Benton Public Library District. The library is located at 502 S. Main St. in Benton. The library has been located at this address for over 80 years and has operated in the current building since 2005.

References

External links
 Official website
 Illinois Collections Preservation Network
 Official Facebook Page

Public libraries in Illinois
Buildings and structures in Franklin County, Illinois
Library buildings completed in 2005